Hopkins Cottage is a historic cure cottage located at Saranac Lake in the town of Harrietstown, Franklin County, New York.  It was built in 1923 and is a rectangular two-story three-bay structure, surmounted by a hipped roof.  Each of the four upstairs bedrooms has its own cure porch measuring 8.5 feet by 12 feet.  It was used as a private nursing establishment for tuberculosis patients until about 1940.

It was listed on the National Register of Historic Places in 1992.

References

Houses on the National Register of Historic Places in New York (state)
Houses completed in 1923
Houses in Franklin County, New York
American Craftsman architecture in New York (state)
National Register of Historic Places in Franklin County, New York